Sylvia Ortiz-Velez is an American politician and real estate broker.  A Democrat, she is a member of the Wisconsin State Assembly from assembly district 8.  She was elected to her first term in November 2020.  She is also a member of the Milwaukee County Board of Supervisors, serving since 2018.

Early life and education
Sylvia Ortiz-Velez was born and raised in Milwaukee, Wisconsin.  She earned a B.A. in political science from the University of Wisconsin–Milwaukee.  She worked as a real estate broker for several years in Milwaukee before being elected to the County Board.

Political career
In 2012, Ortiz-Velez made her first attempt at election to the Milwaukee County Board of Supervisors, challenging four term incumbent supervisor Peggy A. West (then going by the name "Peggy Romo West").  West prevailed in the spring election with 55.71%. Ortiz-Velez challenged West again in 2018, however, and this time defeated her, taking 57% of the vote.  Ortiz-Velez was one of several candidates to benefit from the support of then-County Executive Chris Abele in his attempts to reshape the County Board in 2018.  She was re-elected without opposition in April 2020.

During her time on the County Board, she was a member of the Intergovernmental Relations Committee, the Judiciary, Safety and General Services Committee, and the Transportation, Public Works and Transit Committee.  She was also a member of the Mitchell Park Domes Task Force, tasked with developing a long term plan for the 50-year-old nature conservatory—Ortiz-Velez committed to preserving the domes for future generations in her campaign platform.  In addition to her service on the County Board, Ortiz-Velez serves on the Advisory Board of the United Migrant Opportunity Services (UMOS).

In the spring 2020 election, incumbent Assemblymember JoCasta Zamarripa was elected to the Milwaukee Common Council and announced she would not run for another term in the Wisconsin State Assembly. On April 14, 2020, Ortiz-Velez formally announced her candidacy for Zamarripa's assembly seat.  In the primary, she faced JoAnna Bautch, the sister of outgoing Assemblymember JoCasta Zamarripa, and the Wisconsin Director of Citizen Action.  In the primary, Ortiz-Velez supported expanding BadgerCare (Wisconsin's Medicaid program) and legalization of medical marijuana.  Despite trailing in the early in-person vote returns, Ortiz Velez narrowly won the primary, taking 53% of the vote after absentee ballots were counted.  Ortiz-Velez earned 78% of the vote in the general election, defeating Republican Angel Sanchez.

Personal life and family
Ortiz-Velez is the daughter of a former evangelical minister; she has seven siblings.

Electoral history

Milwaukee County Board (2012)

| colspan="6" style="text-align:center;background-color: #e9e9e9;"| General Election, April 3, 2012

Milwaukee County Board (2018)

| colspan="6" style="text-align:center;background-color: #e9e9e9;"| General Election, April 3, 2018

Wisconsin Assembly (2020)

| colspan="6" style="text-align:center;background-color: #e9e9e9;"| Democratic Primary, August 11, 2020

| colspan="6" style="text-align:center;background-color: #e9e9e9;"| General Election, November 3, 2020

References

External links
 
 
 Official bio at Milwaukee County Board of Supervisors
 Campaign website

Living people
Hispanic and Latino American state legislators in Wisconsin
Hispanic and Latino American women in politics
Year of birth missing (living people)
Women state legislators in Wisconsin
Democratic Party members of the Wisconsin State Assembly
21st-century American politicians
Politicians from Milwaukee
21st-century American women politicians